Igor Yevgenyevich Irodov (16 November 1923 – 22 October 2002) was a Soviet Russian physicist and World War II veteran. He is mostly known as a physics professor at the Moscow Institute of Physics and Engineering (MEPHi) and the author of a series of handbooks on general physics, which became lecture courses in physics in several countries.

Biography
Irodov was born in Murom, Vladimir Oblast, Soviet Union. When he was eight his family moved to Moscow, where he lived until his death. During World War II he fought with various infantry units at the 1st and 4th Ukrainian Fronts, also acting as a drafter and cartographer. He went through Russia, Ukraine and Poland, ending the war in Czechoslovakia. For his bravery he was awarded the orders of the Patriotic War (II degree, 1945) and Red Star (1944), and the medals for Courage (1943), Battle Merit (1944) and the Victory over Germany (1946).

In October 1945 Irodov was demobilized and sent to Moscow to recover his health. in February 1946, he entered the Physics Faculty of MEPHi, graduating with honors in November 1950 with a diploma of designer and operator of physics equipment. After that he worked on his PhD titled Focusing and dispersive properties of particular magnetic fields, which he defended in May 1956 under Academician Lev Artsimovich. Starting from 1954 he worked at the General Physics Department of MEPHi, first as a lecturer and since 1976 as a full professor.

Publications
In 1957 Irodov published his first book, a collection of problems in atomic physics, which was republished in 1959 and later translated into Polish, Romanian and English. Its eighth and expanded edition, issued in 2002, became the last substantial work by Irodov. He also published collections of problems in general physics in 1968 and 1979, which is still used by many students around the world to hone their physics skills and prepare for various Engineering Entrance Exams.

Irodov spent 27 years of his life on writing a noting fully covering a university course on general physics. He published the first part (mechanics) in 1975, the second part (electromagnetism) in 1983, and the full set in 1999–2001. In his handbooks Irodov aimed for brevity, crafting concise and clear definitions and removing unessential details and heavy calculus, and for relating theory with practical examples and problems.

Books in English
A collection of problems in atomic and nuclear physics (1966) Google Books, Archive.org
Fundamental Laws of Mechanics (1980) Archive.org
Problems in General Physics (1981), Archive.org
Basic laws of Electromagnetism (1983) Archive.org

References

1923 births
2002 deaths
Russian physicists
People from Murom
Soviet military personnel of World War II